The 1993 Jordanian  League (known as The Jordanian  League,   was the 43rd season of Jordan  League since its inception in 1944. Al-Faisaly won its 25th title.

Teams

Map

League table

References

Jordanian Pro League seasons
Jordan
football
football